The Model 3107 chair is a chair designed by Arne Jacobsen in 1955. It is a variation on the Ant Chair, also designed by Arne Jacobsen. Over five million units have been produced exclusively by Fritz Hansen.

Description
The chair, along with the Jacobsen's Ant chair, was, according to Jacobsen, inspired by a chair made by the husband and wife design team of Charles and Ray Eames using their plywood bending techniques.

The chair is available with a number of different undercarriages—as a regular four-legged chair, an office chair with five wheels and as a bar stool. It can come equipped with armrests, a writing-table attachment, and different forms of upholstering.

The chair is widely believed to have been used in Lewis Morley's iconic 1963 photograph of Christine Keeler; however, the chair used in this photograph was an imitation and not an original Jacobsen model. The Keeler chair had a hand hold cut in the back. After the publishing of the pictures sales of the chair rose dramatically.

See also
 Ant (chair)
 Bentwood
 Molded plywood
 Swan (chair)

References

External links

 Official Series 7™ chair website
 

1955 in art
Arne Jacobsen furniture
Chairs
Individual models of furniture
Products introduced in 1955
Stacking chairs